Love Is Blind is the third studio album released by Claire Voyant.

Two tracks from the album, "Pieces" and "Twenty-Four Years", as well as "Iolite" from their album, Time Again, appear on the soundtrack to the film Gypsy 83.

Track listing
All songs written by Claire Voyant.
 "Pieces" – 4:34
 "Twenty-Four Years" – 6:18
 "Mirror" – 4:41
 "Abyss" – 4:05
 "Silence" – 4:59
 "He Is Here" – 7:11
 "Close to Me" – 4:49
 "Warm" – 4:21
 "Not Like Me" – 5:39
 "Love Is Blind" – 5:32

Personnel

The band
Victoria Lloyd - Vocals and words
Chris Ross - Keyboards and programming
Benjamin Fargen - Guitars; ride cymbal on track 8

Additional musicians
Ricky Carter - Tambourine on tracks 2 and 6; cymbals on tracks 3 and 4; drums on track 6; additional percussion on track 8
Rich Kazanjian - Bass on track 6
Jeanette Faith - Cello on track 10

Other credits
 Engineering and Production - Chris Ross
 Mastering - Steven Siebold
 Album artwork/design - Michael Swanson
 Management - Colin Gibbens/Luna Productions

External links
Claire Voyant's official website

2002 albums
Claire Voyant (band) albums